The following is a list of most watched Canadian television broadcasts of 1996 (single-network only) according to Nielsen Media Research.

Most watched by week

References

Canadian television-related lists
1996 in Canadian television